Villa Arzilla is an Italian sitcom.

Cast
 Caterina Boratto: Vittoria Gransasso
 Marisa Merlini: La direttrice
 Fiorenzo Fiorentini: Castorani l'antiquario
 Giustino Durano: Gastone
 Ernesto Calindri: Il generale Vezio Vezi
 Mirella Falco: Nonna Coraggio
 Elio Crovetto: Chef
 Carlo Molfese: Ragionier Pantalla
 Salvatore Marino: Gazebo
 Paola Giannetti: Peppa
 Giorgio Tirabassi: Vinicio 
 Yvonne Sciò: Carmen
 Valeria Sabel: Irina 
 Elena Presti: Isabella 
 Giorgio Tirabassi: Barman
 Gigi Proietti: The Gardener

See also
List of Italian television series

External links
 

Italian television series
RAI original programming